A Bundesliga (plural: Bundesligen), meaning Federal League, is the highest league of competition for several sports in Austria and Germany.

In English, the term most often refers to the top division of men's association football in Germany, the Bundesliga (full native name Fußball-Bundesliga), which has operated since 1963.

Bundesligen in Germany
 Other association football leagues:
 Frauen-Bundesliga – Women's top division association football in Germany (1990–present)
 Under 19 Bundesliga – Men's under 19 football (2003–present)
 Under 17 Bundesliga – Men's under 17 football (2007–present)
 Basketball Bundesliga (1966–present)
 Damen-Basketball-Bundesliga (founded 1947), women's basketball
 Bundesliga (baseball) (1984–present)
 Chess Bundesliga (1980–present)
 World League eSport Bundesliga (2005-2006), video games
 Men's Feldhockey Bundesliga
 Women's Feldhockey Bundesliga
 German Football League (1979–present), American football Bundesliga, renamed in 1999
 Go-Bundesliga, Go
 Handball-Bundesliga (1965–present)
 Handball-Bundesliga (women) (founded 1975), women's handball
 Ice hockey
 Deutsche Eishockey Liga (1995–present)
 Eishockey-Bundesliga (1958-1994)
 German women's ice hockey Bundesliga (founded 1988), women's ice hockey
 Roller Hockey Bundesliga (founded 1967), men's roller hockey
 Rugby
 Rugby-Bundesliga, rugby union (1971–present)
 Women's Rugby Bundesliga (1987–present), women's rugby union
 Bundesliga (shooting) (1997–present)
 Bundesliga (table tennis) (1966–present)
 Tennis Bundesliga (men) (1972–present)
 Volleyball
 Deutsche Volleyball-Bundesliga
 German Women's Volleyball League
German Women's 2 Volleyball Bundesliga
 Bundesliga (wrestling) (1964–present)

Bundesligen in Austria
 Austrian Football Bundesliga – men's football
 Austrian Football League – men's American style football
 Austrian Basketball Bundesliga – men's basketball
 1. Rugby Bundesliga - men's rugby
 Austria women's ice hockey Bundesliga (founded 1988), women's ice hockey
 Austrian Judo Bundesliga

See also
 2nd Bundesliga (disambiguation)